The Mitsubishi 500 was the first passenger car produced after the Second World War by Shin Mitsubishi Heavy-Industries, Ltd, one of the companies which would become Mitsubishi Motors. It was built from 1960 until 1962 and formed the basis for Mitsubishi's next model, the Colt 600. It was exported in small numbers.

History
First shown at the 1959 Tokyo Motor Show, it became available in 1960 at a cost of ¥390,000. It was powered by a rear mounted, air-cooled 493 cc two-cylinder engine with a single downdraught carburettor producing  at 5,000 rpm, driving the rear wheels through a three-speed manual transmission. The body was a monocoque, in order to be light and strong enough to reach the goal of seating four and reaching 100 km/h with such a small engine. Chassis code was A10, later A11.

500 Super DeLuxe
Buoyed by its sales success, it was given an enlarged  594 cc engine (NE35A) in August 1961 for improved acceleration and durability. This model was known as the Mitsubishi 500 Super DeLuxe. The succeeding Colt 600 used a great deal of the 500 Super DeLuxe's underpinnings, including the engine and layout. The Mitsubishi 500 was never a Kei car: Kei regulations at the time of introduction mandated an engine no larger than 360 cc, which remained the limit until it was raised to 550 cc January 1, 1976.

Motorsport heritage
Although they are now more renowned for their contemporary successes in off-road racing with the Pajero-based Rally Raid vehicle and Lancer Evo-based WRC car, Mitsubishi's first "homologation special" was a Super DeLuxe-based touring car which the company prepared for the 1962 Macau Grand Prix. In an auspicious debut Kazuo Togawa took class honours, as the diminutive sedan swept the top four places in the "Under 750 cc" category.

References

500
Rear-wheel-drive vehicles
Rear-engined vehicles
Sedans
Cars introduced in 1960